Pontus Widegren (born 14 October 1990) is a Swedish professional golfer.

Widegren became the youngest Club Champion at Stockholm Golf Club after winning the title aged just 13. He turned professional in 2013 after playing college golf for four years while studying at the University of California, Los Angeles, winning twice.

Widegren played on the Challenge Tour 2014–2016 and secured his European Tour card at the 2016 European Tour Qualifying School. He finished runner-up at the 2013 Norwegian Challenge and had a one shot advantage heading into the final day of the 2015 Madeira Islands Open, a dual-ranked Challenge Tour and European Tour event, but eventually tied for fourth.

On the 2017 European Tour, Widegren finished tied for third at the D+D Real Czech Masters.

Amateur wins
 2010 Ping-Golfweek Preview
 2012 CSU San Marco Fall Classic
Source

Team appearances
Amateur
 European Boys' Team Championship (representing Sweden): 2006, 2007
 Junior World Cup: 2007
 European Amateur Team Championship (representing Sweden): 2008, 2009, 2010, 2011
Eisenhower Trophy (representing Sweden): 2008, 2012
 Palmer Cup (representing Europe): 2010, 2011, 2012 (winners), 2013
 St Andrews Trophy (representing the Continent of Europe): 2010 (winners)

Source

See also
2016 European Tour Qualifying School graduates
2017 European Tour Qualifying School graduates

References

External links

Swedish male golfers
UCLA Bruins men's golfers
European Tour golfers
Golfers from Stockholm
1990 births
Living people